The flag of Southern Province, was adopted for the Southern Province of Sri Lanka in 1987.

Symbolism
The design of the flag of the Southern Province is similar to that of the national flag, with a golden lion jumping  in the center holding a sword on a maroon background, surrounded by a yellow borderwith stix wafers  and bo leaves to the corners. The flag also depicts the Sun and the Moon either side of the lion.

See also
 Flag of Sri Lanka
 List of Sri Lankan flags

References

External links
 Southern Provincial Council
 Flagspot
 Sri Lanka.Asia

Southern Province
Southern Province
Southern Province, Sri Lanka
Southern Province
Flags displaying animals